Paparazzi!: Tales of Tinseltown is a video game developed by American studio Museworthy and published by Activision for the Macintosh, Windows 3.x and Windows 95.

Gameplay
Paparazzi!: Tales of Tinseltown is a game in which the player is a free-lance photographer looking to succeed in tabloid photojournalism.

Reception
Next Generation reviewed the Macintosh version of the game, rating it one star out of five, and stated that "For computer first-timers – your parents, say – Paparazzi offers something flashy and mildly amusing to showcase their new CD drive; for gamers, it offers a pair of attractive mirrored coasters."

Reviews
Entertainment Weekly (Feb 10, 1995)
PC Gamer (Oct, 1995)
PC Player - Aug, 1995
PC Games - Aug, 1995

References

1995 video games
Activision games
Full motion video based games
MacOS games
Photography games
Video games developed in the United States
Windows games